Henry Clifford may refer to:

Henry Clifford, 1st Earl of Cumberland (1493–1542)
Henry Clifford, 2nd Earl of Cumberland (1517–1570)
Henry Clifford (died 1577), MP for Salisbury and Great Bedwyn
Henry Clifford, 5th Earl of Cumberland (1591–1643)
Henry Hugh Clifford (1826–1883), English recipient of the Victoria Cross
Henry Clifford, 10th Lord of Skipton, chief commander in the Battle of Flodden, 1513
Henry Clifford (opera) by Isaac Albéniz, about him
Henry Clifford (legal writer) (1768–1813)
Henry de Clifford, MP for Gloucestershire (UK Parliament constituency)
Henry Clifford (field hockey) (born 1928), American Olympic hockey player

See also
Harry Edward Clifford (1852–1932), Trinidadian architect